World Have Your Say (WHYS) is an international BBC global discussion show, that was broadcast on BBC World Service every weekday at 1600 hours UTC and on BBC World News every Friday at 1500 hours UTC.

World Have Your Say won Gold in the 2008 Sony Radio Awards, in the category Listener Participation.

The show described itself as "the BBC News programme where you set the agenda." Typically each edition addressed a question, or number of questions, raised by the users of its blog and Facebook site, as well as emailers to the BBC.

It encouraged callers to talk to each other and directed questions asked by listeners to the guests on the programme, intervening as little as possible to keep the show more of a conversation than a talk show.

The show also occasionally worked as a forum for the BBC World Service's global audience to put questions to a particular guest. Previous guests included Aung San Suu Kyi, Philip Pullman and Thilo Sarrazin.

History

The BBC World Service launched the programme in October 2005, featuring Anu Anand and Steve Richards as presenters and Mark Sandell as editor. Ros Atkins replaced Richards in early 2006 as the main presenter.

Since February 2011 the programme had a weekly television edition on BBC World News on Fridays produced by the same production team.

Topics for discussions were set by listeners, who could email the show prior to it going on air each day, or even call into the studio office. Some of the comments left on the WHYS blog and Facebook site, together with emails, Tweets and SMS text messages, were read on the air. Callers from all over the world were the key part of the programme by calling in and debating the daily topic.

On occasion, the show would leave the studio and go on the road, to discuss subjects from a particular country but often with a global impact. For example, in 2011, they went to Berlin to discuss the legacy of Nazism in Germany, Jakarta to talk about revolution in a Muslim country, and Bangkok to talk about sex tourism.

Most of the time, the topics for the days' show were offered by e-mail. Some stories were suggested by a single person, others by the number of people wanting to talk about it. Increasingly, use was made of the programme's Facebook site as a source of comment on news stories. Sometimes, these were stories from the listeners' point of view. In fact, some of the reporting of current events for the show was done by real world people, most with no journalism experience.

Television

BBC World News began presenting a version of the programme in 2011 with Ros Atkins as the presenter. The programme, presented on Fridays at 1500 GMT, encouraged viewer discussion on some of the top stories from the week. Occasionally, correspondents and high-profile individuals close to the issue at hand would join in the conversation. Similarly to the version on radio, the programme heavily utilised social media; especially Twitter and Facebook.

As of late 2013, Chloe Tilley played a more active role as a presenter.

References

External links
 (BBC World Service)
World Have Your Say (BBC World News)

BBC World Service programmes
British talk radio programmes